Praying Mantis is a 1993 American made-for-television psychological thriller film directed by James Keach, starring Jane Seymour, Barry Bostwick, Chad Allen and Frances Fisher.

Plot
Linda Crandell (Seymour) is a mentally disturbed woman who seduces men and marries them before killing them.

Cast
Jane Seymour as Linda Crandell  
Barry Bostwick as Don McAndrews
Chad Allen as Bobby McAndrews
Frances Fisher as Betty
Colby Chester as Agent Johnson
Michael MacRae as Agent Broderick
Anne Schedeen as Karen

References

External links

1993 television films
1993 films
1990s psychological thriller films
American psychological thriller films
Films shot in Portland, Oregon
Showtime (TV network) films
Films directed by James Keach
Films scored by John Debney
1990s American films